The  was the name of the shadow cabinet when the Democratic Party of Japan was in opposition.  Though DPJ shadow cabinets began in 1999, it only acquired the name in 2003 and dissolved after the DPJ gained power for the first time after the 2009 general elections.

Cabinet of Japan
1999 establishments in Japan
2009 disestablishments in Japan
Shadow cabinets